Robert F. Spada is a former Republican member of the Ohio Senate, representing the 24th District of the U.S. state of Ohio from 1999 to 2008.

External links 
The Ohio Senate - Senator Robert F. Spada official Ohio Senate website
Project Vote Smart - Robert F. 'Bob' Spada (Ohio) profile
Follow the Money - Robert F Spada
2006 2004 2002 2000 campaign contributions

Republican Party Ohio state senators
Living people
Year of birth missing (living people)
21st-century American politicians